Charles Duff (21 April 1794 – 1848) was an English professional cricketer who played first-class cricket from 1824 to 1830.

He played for Sussex and made 12 known appearances in first-class matches.

References

1794 births
1848 deaths
English cricketers
English cricketers of 1787 to 1825
English cricketers of 1826 to 1863
Sussex cricketers
People from Midhurst